The men's 20 kilometres walk event at the 2009 Asian Athletics Championships was held on November 12.

Results

References
Results

2009 Asian Athletics Championships
Racewalking at the Asian Athletics Championships